Farahmand is a Persian surname. Notable people with the surname include:

Reza Farahmand (born 1977), Iranian film director
Saam Farahmand, British film and music video director

Persian-language surnames